The 1983 Nippon Professional Baseball season was the 34th season of operation for the league.

Regular season standings

Central League

Pacific League

Japan Series

Seibu Lions won the series 4–3.

See also
1983 Major League Baseball season

References

1983 in baseball
1983 in Japanese sport